Elmo Moses Arroyo Magalona (born 27 April 1994) is a Filipino actor and singer. He is currently an artist of ABS-CBN and Star Magic. He is the child of Francis Magalona and Pia Magalona.

Biography

2009–2010: Early career
Magalona's first appearance in the Pinoy hip-hop/rock scene was when he was six months old being featured on the cover of his father's album FreeMan. He reappeared on an album cover five years later on FreeMan 2. Magalona also appeared in a noodle commercial called "Lucky Me Supreme" along with his father. He appeared as a young drummer in Kjwan's music video, "One Look". He also studied in College of Saint Benilde.

2010–2014: JuliElmo and breakthrough
In 2010, Magalona began appearing as a regular on Party Pilipinas as a host and performer. Aside from being known as the "Heir of Rap", he became known as the other half of the musical tandem JuliElmo with Julie Anne San Jose, with whom he collaborated in several YouTube videos. The same year, he was cast in Tweets for My Sweet. He also starred as the lead in the series Together Forever opposite Julie Anne San Jose.

In 2010, Magalona joined the cast of GMA's television pilot Bantatay as a series regular. He also appeared in the fantasy series Kaya ng Powers in a recurring role.

In 2011, the young actor-rapper, together with fellow artist Sam Concepcion, performed as the front act of Miley Cyrus's concert at the SM Mall of Asia concert grounds. In the same year, he was launched as a movie star in Tween Hearts: Class of 2012.

In May 2013, Magalona, in collaboration with Oishi, released a remake of a famous song by his dad, and renamed it "Kaleidoscope World Forever More". The remake featured his duet with his father. A music video was also created, with certain modifications and inserting Elmo digitally into the original music video.

In 2014, he was chosen as one of the interpreters of the Philpop entry, "Qrush on You", alongside Jay-R and Q-York. He also made appearances in the Sunday variety show, Sunday All Stars as a host and performer. He was also the lead star in the 2014 CinemalayaX entry, #Y and then starred in the drama Villa Quintana he played Keempee de Leon's role together with Janine Gutierrez who played Donna Cruz's role. The tandem was reunited again in the primetime soap, More Than Words.

He briefly appeared in Magpakailanman in 2015.

2015–present: Transfer to ABS-CBN and ElNella
On 26 November 2015, Magalona left GMA Network and signed a contract with ABS-CBN.

His first project was the 2016 music drama, Born for You with love team partner, Janella Salvador. He collaborated with Salvador in the official soundtrack for Born for You, which reached No. 1 on iTunes Philippines. In October 2016, he released his album, ELMO, which reached a gold record status by PARI.

In 2017, he appeared in Topel Lee's suspense thriller Bloody Crayons with Salvador released nationwide on 12 July.

In 2018, he appeared in two Regal Entertainment movies, My Fairy Tale Love Story with Salvador and Walwal.

Filmography

Film

Television/Digital

Discography

Album

Awards and nominations

References

External links
 

1994 births
Filipino male child actors
Filipino male television actors
21st-century Filipino male singers
Filipino television variety show hosts
Living people
Male actors from Manila
Elmo
GMA Network personalities
ABS-CBN personalities
GMA Music artists
Star Magic
Universal Records (Philippines) artists
21st-century Filipino male actors
Place of birth missing (living people)
Filipino male film actors
Filipino male comedians